Bibliomancy is the use of books in divination. The method of employing sacred books (especially specific words and verses) for 'magical medicine', for removing negative entities, or for divination is widespread in many religions of the world.

Terminology
According to the Oxford English Dictionary, the word bibliomancy (etymologically from βιβλίον biblion- "book" and μαντεία -manteía "divination by means of") "divination by books, or by verses of the Bible" was first recorded in 1753 (Chambers' Cyclopædia). Sometimes this term is used synonymously with stichomancy (from στίχος stichos- "row, line, verse") "divination by lines of verse in books taken at hazard", which was first recorded  (Urquhart's Rabelais).

Bibliomancy compares with rhapsodomancy (from rhapsode "poem", "song", "ode") "divination by reading a random passage from a poem". A historical precedent was the ancient Roman practice of sortes ("sortilege, divination by drawing lots") which specialized into sortes Homericae, sortes Virgilianae, and sortes Sanctorum, using the texts of Homer, Virgil, and the Bible.

History
In Judaism, according to the Shulchan Aruch (Rema, Yoreh Deah, 179), it is not the sin of necromancy to divine an answer using the goral, the practice of opening the Chumash to see an answer to a question, or asking a child for the first piece of scripture that comes to his mind.

Method

 A book is picked that is believed to hold truth.
 It is balanced on its spine and allowed to fall open.
 A passage is picked, with the eyes closed.

Among Christians, the Bible is most commonly used (in the Sortes Sanctorum), and in Islamic cultures the Quran. In the Middle Ages the use of Virgil's Aeneid was common in Europe and known as the sortes Virgilianae.  In the classical world the sortes Virgilianae and sortes Homericae (using the Iliad and Odyssey) were used.

In Iran, bibliomancy using The Divān of Hafez is the most popular for this kind of divination, but by no means the only kind. The Quran, as well as the Mathnawī of Rumi may also be used. Fāl-e Ḥafez may be used for one or more persons. In group bibliomancy, the dīvān will be opened at random, and beginning with the ode of the page that one chances upon, each ode will be read in the name of one of the individuals in the group. The ode is the individual's fāl. Assigning of the odes to individuals depends on the order in which the individuals are seated and is never random. One or three verses from the ode following each person's fāl is called the šāhed, which is read after the recitation of the fāl. According to another tradition the šāhed is the first or the seventh verse from the ode following the fāl . An ode which had already been used for one individual in the group is disqualified from serving as the fāl for a second time.

Because book owners frequently have favorite passages that the books open themselves to, some practitioners use dice or another randomiser to choose the page to be opened. This practice was formalized by the use of coins or yarrow stalks in consulting the I Ching. Tarot divination can also be considered a form of bibliomancy, with the main difference that the cards (pages) are unbound.  Another way around this is to cut the page with something like a razor.

There is a prevalent practice among certain, particularly messianic, members of Chabad-Lubavitch Chasidic movement to use the Igrot Kodesh, a thirty-volume collection of letters written by their leader Menachem Mendel Schneerson for guidance.

Another variant requires the selection of a random book from a library before selecting the random passage from that book. This also holds if a book has fallen down from a shelf on its own. English poet Robert Browning used this method to ask about the fate of his attraction to Elizabeth Barrett (later known as Elizabeth Barrett Browning). He was at first disappointed to choose the book Cerutti's Italian Grammar, but on randomly opening it his eyes fell on the following sentence: "if we love in the other world as we do in this, I shall love thee to eternity" (which was a translation exercise).

Bibliomancy in fiction

In Michael Strogoff (1876) by Jules Verne, Feofar Khan judged Michael Strogoff to blindness after pointing randomly in the Koran at the phrase: "And he will no more see the things of this earth."
In The Book of Webster's (1993) by J. N. Williamson, the sociopathic protagonist Dell uses the dictionary to guide his actions.
In the short story "The Ash-tree" by M. R. James, bibliomancy is used to produce a warning message from the Bible.
The novel The First Verse by Barry McCrea tells the story of Niall Lenihan, a student who falls in with a 'cult' whose members use sortes to guide them.
In the novel The Man in the High Castle by Philip K. Dick, every major character uses bibliomancy, mainly by casting yarrow stalks in conjunction with the I Ching.  Dick himself reportedly used this process to decide key points in the story, even blaming the I Ching for plot developments that he did not particularly care for.
In Wilkie Collins' 1868 novel The Moonstone, the narrator Gabriel Betteredge routinely practices bibliomancy using the pages of Daniel Defoe's Robinson Crusoe. This is a good example of intertextuality, since Crusoe himself uses bibliomancy in his journey toward redemption. 
In Lirael, by Garth Nix, The Black Book of Bibliomancy, a fake book, is mentioned.
In Augusten Burroughs' Running with Scissors, bibliomancy (referred to as "Bible-dipping") is used by one of the main characters.
 The narrator of Graham Greene's Travels With My Aunt recounts that his late father used to practice bibliomancy with the writings of Walter Scott: "Once, when he was suffering severely from Constipation, he opened Rob Roy at random and read out "Mr Owen entered. So regular were the motions and habits of this worthy man". ( Travels With My Aunt, Ch.16.)

See also 
 Bible code
 Rhapsodomancy

References

External links

 Bibliomancy from the Jewish Encyclopedia
 Bibliomancy Oracle

Divination
Bible
Language and mysticism